Sir Arthur Bryan (4 March 1923 – 11 February 2011) was managing director of the Wedgwood pottery firm (now Waterford Wedgwood).  He became the first non-Wedgwood family member to hold the post when he succeeded Josiah Wedgwood V in 1967.  He was knighted in 1976 for services to export.

External links

 Biography at www.wedgwoodmuseum.org.uk

1923 births
2011 deaths
Businesspeople awarded knighthoods
Knights Bachelor
Lord-Lieutenants of Staffordshire
20th-century British businesspeople